E. V. Ganesh Babu is an Indian film director, writer and actor who works in Tamil-language films. He made his acting debut with Bharathi (2000) and played Vijay's friend in four films including Sivakasi (2005). He worked as an assistant director for Thenpandi Singam (2016) before making his debut as a director with Yamuna (2013). He directed and starred in a film titled Kattil opposite Srushti Dange, which was screened in 2021 at a Innovative International Film Festival. In 2022, he adapted the script of Kattil into a book.

Filmography

As actor
Films
Bharathi (2000)
Friends (2001) 
Bhagavathi (2002)
Pudhiya Geethai (2003)
Ooruku Nooruper (2003)
Autograph (2004)
Sivakasi (2005)
Mozhi (2007)
 Kattradhu Thamizh (2007)
Silandhi (2008)
Anandhapurathu Veedu (2010)
Television
Ramani vs Ramani - Part 2 (Raj TV)
Kuladeivam (Sun TV)

As director
Yamuna (2013)
Kattil (2022)

As writer
Kattil (2022, book)

Author 

He has published the censor script book of the film “Yamuna” which was directed by him and the making script of the movie Kattil directed by him. He is as an author of those books in addition to that “Kalachakkaram“ is a poetry book written by him.

He is a recipient of various awards for the film Kattil Directed by him and many books written by him.

Education 
He studied B.LIT (Tamil Literature) in Thanjavur Karanthai tamil sangam and stepped into the Film industry after getting profound experienced through acting and directing more than 500 stage dramas, Miming (Acting through Gestures) and one act play (Operetta)

References

External links 

 

1974 births
Living people
Actors in Tamil cinema
Film directors from Tamil Nadu
Male actors in Tamil cinema
Tamil film directors